George Boardman Clark House, also known as Kellerman House, is a historic home located at Cape Girardeau, Missouri.  It was built in 1882, and is a two-story, "T"-plan, Queen Anne style painted brick dwelling. It sits on a sandstone foundation.  About 1909, the original one-story front porch was replaced with a two-story porch.

It was listed on the National Register of Historic Places in 1994. It is located in the Courthouse-Seminary Neighborhood Historic District.

References

Individually listed contributing properties to historic districts on the National Register in Missouri
Houses on the National Register of Historic Places in Missouri
Queen Anne architecture in Missouri
Houses completed in 1882
Houses in Cape Girardeau County, Missouri
National Register of Historic Places in Cape Girardeau County, Missouri